Dar Chioukh District is a district of Djelfa Province, Algeria.

Municipalities
The district is further divided into 3 municipalities:

Dar Chioukh
Mouilha
Sidi Baizid

Districts of Djelfa Province